Deyair Reyes Contreras (born 4 March 1992) is a Peruvian footballer who plays as a left back or winger for Cienciano in the Peruvian Segunda División.

Club career
Deyair Reyes began his senior career with Sport Huancayo in 2010. However his Torneo Descentralizado league debut came the following season on matchday 1 away to Cienciano. Manager Roberto Mosquera put Reyes in the match in 71st minute but he could not help his side avoid the 1–0 defeat. Reyes scored his first league goal in matchday 4 in the 3–0 home win over Universidad César Vallejo.

In December 2011 Reyes joined Sporting Cristal along with his manager Roberto Mosquera.

References

External links

1992 births
Living people
Footballers from Lima
Peruvian footballers
Peruvian Segunda División players
Sport Huancayo footballers
Sporting Cristal footballers
Juan Aurich footballers
Unión Comercio footballers
Los Caimanes footballers
Alianza Atlético footballers
Unión Huaral footballers
Cienciano footballers
Peruvian Primera División players
Association football fullbacks
Association football wingers